Patrick McGuinness (born 1968) is a British academic, critic, novelist, and poet. He is Professor of French and Comparative Literature at the University of Oxford, where he is Fellow and Tutor at St Anne's College.

Life 
McGuinness was born in Tunisia in 1968 to a Belgian French-speaking mother and an English father of Irish descent. He grew up in Belgium and also lived for periods in Venezuela, Iran, Romania and the UK.

McGuinness is a member of Plaid Cymru and stood as a candidate for the party in Wales in the 2019 European Parliament election. He has called for the British monarchy to be abolished.

He currently lives in Oxford and in Wales, with his family. He has two children, Osian and Mari McGuinness.

Work 
McGuinness's production is divided between academic literary criticism and fiction, memoir and poetry. His first novel, The Last Hundred Days (Seren, 2011) was centred on the end of the Ceaușescus' regime in Romania, and was nominated for the Man Booker Prize; a French version was published under the title Les Cent Derniers Jours.

Literary criticism and academic work
Patrick McGuinness teaches French and Comparative Literature at St Anne's College, Oxford.  Among his academic publications there is a study of T. E. Hulme, an English literary critic and poet who was influenced by Bergson and who, in turn, had a strong influence on English modernism.  He has also translated Stéphane Mallarmé, a major symbolist poet, and edited an anthology in French of symbolist and decadent poetry.

He has edited the works of Marcel Schwob, a French symbolist and short story writer, a friend of Oscar Wilde, and has written on the French writer Joris-Karl Huysmans.

McGuinness has also edited two volumes of the Argentinian-Welsh poet and novelist Lynette Roberts, who was highly appreciated by T. S. Eliot and Robert Graves. According to McGuinness, Roberts "might fairly be claimed to be our greatest female war poet" whose work "constitutes one of the most imaginative poetic responses to modern war and the home front in the English language."<ref>{{cite web |title=A quite extraordinary affair': the impetuous life and free-ranging work of Lynette Roberts' - Patrick McGuinness, The Times Literary Supplement |url=https://www.carcanet.co.uk/cgi-bin/scribe?showdoc=762;doctype=review |website=Carcanet Press |access-date=14 March 2023}}</ref>

Poetry and novels

McGuinness published his first poetry collection, The Canals of Mars, in 2004. The book was translated into Italian (2006). In 2009 Alexandra Buchler and Eva Klimentova translated McGuinness' poems from The Canals of Mars and 19th Century Blues into Czech

In 2007 he published a poetry pamphlet, 19th Century Blues, which was a winner in The Poetry Business Book & Pamphlet Competition 2006.
His latest poetry collection is Jilted City, whose leitmotif is memory, the jilted city, the cité trahie. A sequence in the book called Blue Guide is about the train journeys made by the young McGuinness on the historic railway line, la ligne 162, between Brussels and Luxembourg. This sequence has been translated into French by Gilles Ortlieb, in the review Théodore Balmoral.  The whole collection has been translated into Italian by Giorgia Sensi and published with the title L'età della sedia vuota, the title of one of the poems in the book, as a homage to the female experience and perspective of war, an empty chair on the beach as a symbol of a violent and irrational absence.

Patrick McGuinness's first novel, The Last Hundred Days, was nominated for the Man Booker Prize in 2011. A thriller dealing with the collapse of communism, it is set in Ceaușescu's Romania, one of the most paranoid totalitarian regimes where spying on the citizens' private lives threatens all human relationships. The protagonist is an English student teaching in Bucharest, where McGuinness himself lived in the years leading up to the revolution.

His memoir of childhood in the Belgian town of Bouillon, 'Other People's Countries: A Journey into Memory', appeared in 2014 and won the Duff Cooper Prize and the Wales Book of the Year, and was shortlisted for the Pen Ackerley Prize and the James Tait Black Memorial Prize.

His second novel, Throw Me to the Wolves, was published in 2019 by Cape and won the Royal Society of Literature's Encore Award. It is part detective thriller, part meditation on memory.

In 2021, he published Real Oxford, a personal book, part urban topography, part literary wander, about the Oxford beyond the classic university city. 

He is a Fellow of the Royal Society of Literature.

Awards
1998 Eric Gregory Award
2001 Levinson Prize
2005 Roland Mathias Prize, shortlist, The Canals of Mars2006 Poetry Business Competition, 19th Century Blues2009 Chevalier dans l'Ordre des Palmes Académiques
2011 Costa Book Awards, shortlist, The Last Hundred Days2012 Chevalier des Arts et des Lettres
2012 Winner Wales Book of the Year Award for The Last Hundred Days2012 Winner Writers' Guild Award for Fiction for The Last Hundred Days.
2012 Winner Prix du Premier Roman Etranger for French translation of The Last Hundred Days.
2012 Finalist of Prix Médicis étranger for Les cent derniers jours.
2012 Finalist of Prix Femina étranger for Les cent derniers jours.
2014 Winner of Duff Cooper Prize for Other People's Countries2016 Winner of the Gapper Prize for French Studies, for Poetry and Radical Politics in fin de siècle France
Longlisted for the 2020 Crime Writers Association Golden Dagger Aaward for Throw Me to the Wolves
2020 Winner of Encore Award for Throw Me to the Wolves Bibliography T. E. Hulme: Selected Writings (Carcanet Press/Routledge USA, 1998, 2003) 
 New Poetries II, an anthology, edited by Michael Schmidt, Carcanet, 1999, pp. 70–76  Maurice Maeterlinck and the Making of Modern Theatre  Oxford University Press, 1999 Symbolism, Decadence and the 'Fin de Siècle': French and European Perspectives (editor) University of Exeter Press, 2000 Anthologie de la Poésie Symboliste et Décadente (editor) Les Belles Lettres (France), 2001 J-K Huysmans' Against Nature (editor) Penguin, 2003 
S.Mallarmé For Anatole's Tomb (translator) Carcanet, 2003, 
Marcel Schwob, Oeuvres  (editor) Les Belles Lettres (France), 2003 The Canals of Mars Carcanet, 2004, Lynette Roberts: Collected Poems (editor) Carcanet, 2005,   I canali di Marte edited and translated by Giorgia Sensi, Mobydick, 2006,   19th Century Blues Smith/Doorstop, 2007,  Lynette Roberts: Diaries, Letters and Recollections, (editor) Carcanet, 2009,  Jilted City  Carcanet, 2010,  L'età della sedia vuota, (original title Jilted City) ed. and transl. by Giorgia Sensi, Il Ponte del Sale, Rovigo, 2011,  
 The Last Hundred Days, Seren, 2011, 
 Other People's Countries: A Journey into Memory, Jonathan Cape, 2014 
 Poetry and Radical Politics in Fin de Siecle France: From Anarchism to Action Francaise, OUP, 2015
 Throw Me to the Wolves, Jonathan Cape, 2019, 
 Real Oxford,'' Seren Books, 2021.

See also 
Symbolism (arts)
Modernism
Modernist poetry
Vorticism

References

External links 
   Patrick McGuinness webpage
  Guggenheim, Venice 2011 – Vorticism P. McGuinness

1968 births
21st-century British novelists
British poets
Living people
British male poets
British male novelists
21st-century British male writers